Electronic and Electrical Computer-aided design (ECAD) is a category of software tools for designing electronic systems.

ECAD may also refer to:
ECAD, Inc., an electronic design automation company that became part of Cadence Design Systems
ECAD (Brazil), the Brazilian music licensing organisation